Cheryl Ann Araujo (March 28, 1961  December 14, 1986) was an American woman from New Bedford, Massachusetts, who was gang-raped in 1983 at age 21 by four men in a tavern in the city, while other patrons reportedly watched but did not intervene. Her case became national news and drew widespread attention to media coverage of rape trials.

During the prosecution of the case, the defendants' attorneys cross-examined Araujo to such an extent about her own life and activities that the case became widely seen as a template for "blaming the victim" in rape cases. Her case was widely known as "Big Dan's rape," after the name of the bar in which the attack occurred.

Ostracized in New Bedford, Araujo moved with her family to Miami to make a new life. Shortly after, on December 14, 1986, she died in a car crash near her home.

Her case prompted national debate at the time over broadcasting of the trial, during which her name was released. Some states have passed legislation to protect the names of rape victims. Court cases have attempted to settle issues of newsworthiness, freedom of the press, and state interest, as well as personal privacy. Her case was the basis of the film The Accused (1988) starring Jodie Foster.

Rape 
On March 6, 1983, after putting her two daughters to sleep following a third birthday party for the older girl, Araujo left her home in New Bedford, Massachusetts, to buy cigarettes. The store she usually purchased from was closed, so she stopped at Big Dan's Tavern to purchase cigarettes from the vending machine. 

Reports differ on how long Araujo spent in the bar before the assault, but she apparently had a drink and socialized with a waitress she knew and then watched some men playing pool at the back of the tavern. When she tried to return to the bar area, Joseph Vieira and Daniel Silva attacked her and began tearing her clothes off. A third man grabbed her from behind and threw her onto the bar's pool table. She was stripped below the waist, and several men raped her. According to Araujo's original report to police, she heard people "laughing, cheering, yelling", but no one responded to her cries for help. Bartender Carlos Machado testified later that when he tried to call the police, Virgilio Medeiros blocked his access to the phone, and that other bar patrons were too intimidated to intervene.

Araujo's initial statements that there was a crowd of men cheering on the rapists was called into question at the trial. Initial police accounts that there were "12-15 jeering" onlookers were widely reported by the media and led to public outrage, though there were only ten people in the bar during the attack: the victim, the six defendants, the bartender, a patron who tried to call the police and a sleeping drunk. Araujo admitted at trial that in light of the trauma of the assault she could not be sure how many men were in the bar, but that she did hear cheering. Indeed, one of the men present testified that he called out "Go for it!" during the attack.

Eventually, Araujo fought off her attackers and ran half-naked into the street, screaming that she had been raped. Three college students passing by in a van came upon Araujo in the street and drove her to the nearest hospital.

Prosecution
Six men were arrested and charged in connection with the rape; four, Victor Raposo, John Cordeiro, Joseph Vieira and Daniel Silva, were charged with aggravated rape; and two, Virgilio Medeiros and Jose Medeiros (no relation), were charged with "joint enterprise," (i.e., encouraging an illegal act and not acting to stop it). Only two trials -- one for the four men charged with aggravated rape, one for the two men charged with joint enterprise -- were conducted, reportedly in order to avoid having the men testify against one another.

The three college students who drove Araujo to the hospital testified as to her state of terror when they encountered her. Defense attorneys questioned the victim about her personal life, suggesting she had invited or somehow deserved the attack. During live TV coverage of the trial in the US, the victim's name was broadcast although victims' names were not typically released to the public in rape cases at the time. After allowing TV coverage, the courts had the right to prevent disclosure of the woman's name but did not. The courts later admonished the press for releasing her name.

Four defendants were convicted of aggravated rape; the two other men were acquitted. The most any of the men served was 6½ years.

Issues of media coverage

The trials attracted international attention. People in the majority Portuguese community of New Bedford felt the case was a catalyst for stirring ethnic discrimination and anti-immigrant sentiment. With some of the media's coverage being xenophobic in nature the community subjected to racist slurs while several witnesses testifying against the defendants received death threats. Larry Flynt's pornographic magazine, Hustler distributed fabricated postcards with the caption, "Greetings from New Bedford, Massachusetts, The Portuguese Gang-Rape Capital of America" and depicted a nude woman lying on a pool table.

This case added to the debate of whether rape victims had a right to privacy because of the nature of the crime. The prosecutor said that he believed victims should be protected by having trials be closed, in order to protect their privacy. He felt the publicity might discourage rape victims from trying to get justice. There was considerable controversy at the time over broadcasting the rape trial. The broadcasts received wide ratings. As one study later noted, "Publication of a rape victim's name severely invades the personal privacy interests of the victim and exposes the victim to a variety of social and psychological problems."

There was national debate about the issue of releasing the victim's name, and United States Senator Arlen Specter of Pennsylvania held subcommittee hearings on the issue of televised trials after the conclusion of this case. Supporters of broadcasting criminal trials felt that newscasters should have used their editing capacity to delete Araujo's name. As noted by Peter Kaplan, Specter said, "Some hard thinking has to be done in protecting the rights of witnesses and defendants." He added, "If this could be achieved, it would be highly desirable to televise rape cases, child-abuse cases and other crimes." Other supporters also believed that it was important to show the judicial process.

Other concerns about media coverage of this case related to the press' repetition of the first police report, without adequate attribution. They published Araujo's initial account of a crowd cheering in the bar. It was found that there were fewer men in the tavern than she claimed; during the trial, she said the attack resulted in her being distraught and distorting the number. But the dramatic first account had staying power; it was repeated even after more factually accurate accounts were published and broadcast.

Later life and death 
Araujo was essentially ostracized in New Bedford. Shortly after the trial, she moved to Miami, Florida, along with her two daughters and their father—Araujo's high school sweetheart—to find anonymity. Araujo had entered school to become a secretary.

On December 14, 1986, around 4:46 p.m., Araujo was returning from her Christmas show in Tropical Park with her daughters when she lost control of her car and struck a cement utility pole on the driver's side door. Her 4 year old daughter's arm was broken while her 6 year old daughter suffered minor injuries. Araujo died from multiple injuries in the crash. She was 25 years old. 

Initially, sources differ about what caused the crash. At first, in the days that followed the crash, the Associated Press reported that, according to the Florida Highway Patrol, "the cause of the crash was not known. Investigators [had] said alcohol or drugs were not involved." At the same time, The New York Times also reported that "Trooper Ed Rizera, who investigated the accident, [had] said that there was no apparent cause for the accident, but that there would be a further homicide investigation."

About a week later, some contradictory information came from United Press International and the Associated Press. Both news agencies now reported that Araujo allegedly was severely intoxicated at the moment of the crash. According to Valerie Rao of the Dade County medical examiner's office in Miami, Araujo "had a blood alcohol level nearly three times the level at which one is considered legally drunk when she lost control of her car in South Miami." According to the same source, officials revealed that Araujo "had spent more than half of the year" in a Miami detoxification center and a residential drug and alcohol abuse treatment program for women."

About two years later, an article in The Washington Post about alcoholism in women referred specifically to the case of Araujo, stating that alcohol had most likely been a determining factor in the crash.

Legacy
The feature film drama The Accused (1988) was inspired by this case. It starred Jodie Foster, who won the Academy Award for Best Actress for her performance as the woman attacked, and Kelly McGillis as an assistant district attorney prosecuting the case. During interviews related to the film, McGillis acknowledged that she had also survived an assault and rape. She discussed her long struggle to get over the attack, and her decision to talk about it in the hope of helping other victims.

In 2019, author Karen Curtis' book The Accuser: The True Story of the Big Dan's Gang Rape Victim was released. Curtis interviewed Araujo's daughters in 2006 and they remember a "white van ran them off the road." Curtis obtained the FHP accident report which confirmed the girls' story. The report is published in the book. Crash photos, including those of Araujo dead at the scene, are also published in the book along with the autopsy and toxicology reports. The Accuser also delves into the two rape trials that were covered by media from around the world with cameras in the courtroom and how Araujo was run out of town after the convictions. Curtis also published transcript excerpts from the Senate judiciary committee hearing convened after the trials which condemned the television coverage. The salacious testimony was broadcast during the middle of the day as children returned home from school.

In 2020, the Araujo case was featured as an episode of the Netflix documentary series Trial by Media; the episode "Big Dan's" explores the effect that the broadcasting of the trial had on Araujo, the New Bedford community, and American society at large.

See also
Cox Broadcasting Corp. v. Cohn (1975), upholds freedom of the press to publish information (including names of rape victims) obtained from public sources

References

Further reading 
 Benedict, Helen. Virgin or Vamp: How the Press Covers Sex Crimes. New York: Oxford University Press, 1992.
 Chancer, Lynn S. (Sept. 1987). "New Bedford, Massachusetts, March 6, 1983 – March 22, 1984: The 'Before and After' of a Group Rape".  Gender & Society Vol. 1, No. 3, pp. 239-260. SAGE, 2009. .  .
 Curtis, Karen M. The Accuser: The True Story of the Big Dan's Gang Rape Victim. Newman Springs Publishing, 2019.

External links 
 

1961 births 
1986 deaths
American people of Portuguese descent
Crimes in Massachusetts
Gang rape in the United States
Incidents of violence against women
People from New Bedford, Massachusetts
Road incident deaths in Florida
History of women in Florida
Violence against women in the United States